Hilarographa auroscripta is a species of moth of the family Tortricidae. It is found on Ambon Island of Indonesia.

The wingspan is about 12 mm. The ground colour of the forewings is orange, consisting of three basal streaks and three transverse postbasal lines. The termen is orange-brown edged, with two brown spots in the median part. The hindwings are orange with brown parts.

Etymology
The specific name refers to colouration of the moth and is derived from Latin aureus (meaning  golden) and scripta (meaning written).

References

Moths described in 2009
Hilarographini